A bus garage, also known as a bus depot, bus base or bus barn, is a facility where buses are stored and maintained. In many conurbations, bus garages are on the site of former car barns or tram sheds, where trams (streetcars) were stored, and the operation transferred to buses. In other areas, garages were built to replace horsebus yards or on virgin sites when populations were not as high as now.

Description
Most bus garages will contain the following elements:
Internal parking
External parking
Fueling point
Fuel storage tanks
Engineering section
Inspection pits
Bus wash
Brake test lane
Staff canteen/break room
Administration office
Smaller garages may contain the minimum engineering facilities, restricted to light servicing capabilities only. Garages may also contain recovery vehicles, often converted buses, although their incidence has declined with the use of contractors to recover break-downs, and the increase in reliability.

Overnight, the more valuable or regularly in-service buses will usually be stored in the interior of the garage, with less used or older service vehicles, and vehicles withdrawn for storage or awaiting disposal, stored externally. During the day, internal and external areas will see a variety of movements. Heritage vehicles are almost exclusively stored inside the garage.

Often garages will feature rest rooms for drivers assigned to 'as required' duties, whereby they may be required to drive relief or replacement buses in the event of breakdown. The garage may also have 'light duties' drivers, who merely move the buses internally around the garage, often called shunting. Shunter or light duty drivers are often employed in larger depot facilities and work night shifts in order to position buses in the correct order for morning departures from the depot with the first buses due to leave the depot parked logical order nearest the exit. Because they are driving on privately owned land in many jurisdictions a full bus licence may not be required to perform such tasks. In addition they may also perform other tasks such as cleaning buses, refuelling and light maintenance tasks.

United Kingdom

Several bus companies such as London Buses and Lothian Buses used to operate multiple storage garages around their operating area, supplemented by a central works facility. Central works have declined with increase in sub-contract engineering, and improvements in mechanical reliability of bus designs. Also, the practice of routine mid-life refurbishment of bus fleets has declined, which has resulted in generally shorter service lives.

Bus garages will generally have large areas unobstructed by supporting columns as well as high roofs, especially for storage of double-decker buses. Recently in London, the transfer of routes from double-decker operation to articulated buses has caused problems at some garages that were found to be too small to accommodate all the replacement buses, requiring splitting of allocations, or the building of new garages.

Some bus companies in the UK make use of outstations (or out-stations) as an additional bus storage facility. These are generally outdoor parking locations, where buses are stored overnight or between peaks, which are more conveniently located for operations, reducing dead mileage. There does not appear to be a universal definition of an outstation, but it seems agreed that there are no maintenance facilities at a bus outstation.

Largest
The largest bus depot in the world is Millennium Park Bus Depot In Delhi India, built for the Commonwealth Games in 2010.

Notes

See also 

 Bus station
 Bus terminus
 Railway workshop

References